The 1848 Grand National Steeplechase was the tenth official annual running of a handicap steeplechase horse race at Aintree Racecourse near Liverpool on Wednesday, 1 March. It attracted a then record, field of 29 competitors for a prize valued at £1,015 to the winner.

The race was won by Lieutenant Josey Little on Captain William Peel's Chandler trained by Tom Eskrett. Lieutenant Little wore Captain Peel's colours of white silks with a black cap. The horse won in a time of 11 minutes and 21 seconds, forty-two seconds slower than the course record set the previous year. With the proceeds of the race Lieutenant Little was able to purchase his promotion to the rank of captain in the 1st King's Dragoon Guards.
Tom Olliver rode in the race for a record tenth time, finishing second on The Curate. The race was marred by the fatal falls of three competitors at the same fence in the latter stages of the second circuit, taking the total number of fatalities in the history of the race to five.

Finishing order

No official returns for the Grand National exist prior to 1865. The return below is that published by the reporter of The Times newspaper the day after the race.

References

Grand National
 1848
Grand National
19th century in Lancashire
March 1848  sports events